Princess Yata (? – after 399) was Empress of Japan as the consort of Emperor Nintoku.

Daughter of Emperor Ōjin; half-sister of Emperor Nintoku.

Notes

Japanese empresses
Year of death missing
4th-century Japanese women
Japanese princesses